Paul Elliman (1961) is a British artist and designer based in London. His work combines an interest in typography and the human voice, often referring to forms of audio signage that mediate a relationship between them. His typeface Found Fount (aka Bits) is an ongoing collection of found ‘typography’ drawn from objects and industrial debris in which no letter-form is repeated.

Elliman's work has addressed the instrumentalisation of the human voice as a kind of typography, engaging the voice in many of its social and technological guises, as well as imitating other languages and random sounds of the city including the non-verbal messages of emergency vehicle sirens, radio transmissions and the muted acoustics of architectural spaces.

He has exhibited in the Institute of Contemporary Arts and Tate Modern in London, the New Museum and Moma (Ecstatic Alphabets, 2012) in New York, APAP in Anyang, South Korea, and Kunsthalle Basel. In 2009 his project "Sirens Taken for Wonders" was commissioned for the New York biennial Performa09, and took the form of a radio discussion about the coded language of emergency vehicle sirens, as well as a series of siren-walks through the city.

In 2010 he contributed a series of whistled versions of bird song transcriptions by Olivier Messiaen for the show We Were Exuberant and Still Had Hope, at Marres Centre for Contemporary Art, Maastricht.

Elliman is visiting critic at Yale School of Art, New Haven, and a thesis supervisor at the Werkplaats Typografie in Arnhem, Netherlands.

References

External links

 Now Hear This, Wired archive, June 2003
 Werkplaats Typografie online
 Ecstatic Alphabets

English contemporary artists
English male voice actors
1961 births
Living people